Fresh Pond is a 14 ha water body in the country of Sint Maarten on the island of Saint Martin in the Dutch Caribbean. It has been identified as an Important Bird Area by BirdLife International because it supports populations of various threatened or restricted-range bird species. Some 2.5 km long by 1 km across, it lies within the capital city of Philipsburg. Because of its low salinity (2-3 parts per thousand), it supports species which are less common in other parts of the island. The pond is bordered with reeds, mangroves and coconut palms. American coots have been recorded breeding at the site, as well as snowy egrets, pied-billed grebes, common moorhens, great egrets, white-cheeked pintails and ruddy ducks. Other birds for which the IBA was designated include green-throated caribs, Antillean crested hummingbirds, Caribbean elaenias, pearly-eyed thrashers and lesser Antillean bullfinches.

References

Important Bird Areas of the Dutch Caribbean
 Natural history of Sint Maarten
Bodies of water of Sint Maarten